Nexi S.p.A. formerly known as Istituto Centrale delle Banche Popolari Italiane S.p.A. (ICBPI) is an Italian bank that specialises in payment systems such as Nexi Payments (formerly known as CartaSi). The bank was specialised as a central institution of Italian Popular Bank..

History
Istituto Centrale delle Banche Popolari Italiane (ICBPI) was founded by Banca Popolare di Cremona, Intra, Lecco, Lodi, Luino e Varese and Verona in 1939.

In 2006, it acquired Key Client Cards & Solutions, a spin-off of Deutsche Bank. Since January 28, 2008, the Automated Clearing House – ACH Sepa Compliant with ICCREA Banca has been activated. In April 2008, it incorporated the Centralized Services Joint Stock Company – Seceti. On 15 September, 2008, in Vienna ICBPI signed an agreement with Equens SE for the establishment of the Equens Italia joint venture, which will carry out the Automated Clearing House activity in Italy as insourcer of ICBPI and ICCREA.

At the end of 2008, the process of acquiring the majority of S.I. Holding (which controls 100% CartaSi S.p.A., Si Servizi S.p.A., Si Call S.p.A., Carta Facile S.p.A, CartaSi Capital S.p.A. and SiRe Business Services LTD), concluding the acquisition, following the obtaining of the required authorizations from the Italian Competition Authority, in particular the Bank of Italy and the Antitrust Authority, in June 2009.

In September 2010, the formalization of an agreement for the purchase of the custodian bank business from Banca Carige was announced for 19.5 million euro. In November 2010, the acquisition of the custodian bank activity from Banca Sella was announced, which at the same time became a shareholder of ICBPI with a 0.96% stake. In November 2010, the ICBPI was condemned by the Antitrust to pay a fine of 490,000 euros for agreements restricting competition in relation to the credit card sector, which was subsequently suspended by the Lazio TAR.

In 2015, the bank was acquired by a consortium of Bain Capital, Advent International and Clessidra SGR; the investment managers incorporated a SPV "Mercury Bondco plc" to issue notes to raise debt, in order to lend to sister companies: Mercury A Capital Limited, Mercury B Capital Limited and Mercury ABC Capital Limited, the parent companies of Mercury UK Holdco Limited, which in turn the parent company of ICBPI.

In February 2017, ICPBI acquired the card business of Banca Monte dei Paschi di Siena for €520 million.

In November 2017, the company was renamed to Nexi, while its card business was renamed from CartaSi to Nexi Payments.

On 5 October 2020, it was announced Nexi will merge with SIA S.p.A., will create one of Europe’s largest fintech groups.

On June 16, 2021, the merger deed with the Danish Nets was signed, which allows Nexi to expand its range of action at a European level; finally, on October 15, 2021, the Competition and Market Authority approved with indication the merger by incorporation of SIA spa into Nexi. This further step generates the first European group in the payment systems sector.

Shareholders

Before Mercury
Credito Valtellinese (Creval) was the largest shareholders of the bank for 20.39% as at 1 January 2015. 

On 18 December 2015, the shares held by Creval (18.39%), Banco Popolare (13.88%), Banca Popolare di Vicenza (9.99%), Veneto Banca (9.99%), Banca Popolare dell'Emilia Romagna (9.14%), ICCREA Holding (7.42%), Banca Popolare di Cividale (4.44%), UBI Banca (4.04%), Banca Popolare di Milano (4.00%), Banca Carige (2.20%), Banca Sella Holding (1.80%) and some minor banks, were sold to an intermediate holding company Mercury Italy S.r.l.. (an investment vehicle indirectly owned by funds advised by Bain Capital, Advent International and Clessidra SGR) On 29 December 2016, Mercury Italy was merged with ICBPI, which Mercury UK Holdco Limited (parent of Mercury Italy) became the new parent company of the bank.

After Mercury
After the sales in December 2015, Credito Valtellinese (Creval) retained 1.9989% as the second largest shareholders, followed by Banca Popolare di Sondrio which did not sell (1.9973%). Creval, Banco Popolare (1.5%), Banca Popolare dell'Emilia Romagna (1.5%), Banca Popolare di Milano (BPM, 1.0%), UBI Banca (1.0%), Banca Popolare di Cividale (0.7%), ICCREA Holding (0.5%), Banca Sella Holding (0.2%) collectively retained about 8.4% shares.

Other than BP Sondrio, only 5 more banks did not sell the shares: Banca Popolare di Bari (BP Bari; 0.1081%), Cassa di Sovvenzioni e Risparmio fra il Personale della Banca d'Italia (0.0121%), Banca Popolare del Frusinate (0.0014%), Banca Popolare Vesuviana (0.0011%) and Cassa di Risparmio di Ferrara (Carife, 0.0009%).

Since the merger of Banco Popolare and BPM on 1 January 2017, Banco BPM became the second largest shareholder of ICBPI. As BPER Banca (ex-Banca Popolare dell'Emilia Romagna) also acquired Nuova Carife, as well as the disinvestment of by Cassa di Sovvenzioni e Risparmio fra il Personale della Banca d'Italia and BP Bari, making the shareholders base of ICBPI was further reduced to 11 entities (by banking group and excluding treasury shares).

Footnotes

References

External links
  

Banks established in 1939
Italian companies established in 1939
banks of Italy
Companies based in Milan
Credito Valtellinese
BPER Banca
Banco Popolare
Former cooperative banks of Italy